Remington is the major-label debut album from American country music artist Granger Smith.  It was released on March 4, 2016, via Wheelhouse Records.  Its lead single, "Backroad Song", was released independently to radio on March 24, 2015.  It was then re-released to radio on October 5, 2015, after Smith's signing with the label. The album's second single, "If the Boot Fits", was released to country radio on March 14, 2016.

Commercial performance 
The album debuted at No. 3 on the Top Country Albums chart, a career high for Smith, selling 24,000 in its release week.  The album has sold 81,200 copies in the US as of May 2017.

Track listing

Personnel

 Geoff Ashcroft – electric guitar
 Richard Barrow – background vocals
 Stewart Blake – background vocals
 Mike Brignardello – bass guitar
 Mitch Connell – piano, organ
 Eric Darken – percussion
 Milo Deering – mandolin
 Earl Dibbles Jr. – lead vocals on "Country Boy Love", "City Boy Stuck", and "Merica"
 Brooke Eden – duet vocals on "Crazy as Me"
 Shannon Forrest – drums
 Kenny Greenberg – electric guitar
 Wes Hightower – background vocals
 Michael Holleman – drums
 Todd Howard – electric guitar, background vocals
 Chad Jeffers – Dobro
 Mike Johnson – Dobro
 Tim Lauer – keyboards
 Chris Lee – background vocals
 Jeremy Lee – background vocals
 Jerry McPherson – electric guitar

 Rob McNelley – electric guitar
 Frank Maglin – background vocals
 Carl Miner – mandolin
 Gordon Mote – piano
 Danny Rader – banjo, bouzouki, acoustic guitar, mandolin
 Michael Rhodes – bass guitar
 Jerry Roe – drums, percussion
 Frank Rogers – drum programming, electric guitar, background vocals
 Manny Rogers – background vocals
 Dusty Saxton – drum programming, drums, snare drum, keyboard programming, background vocals
 Bull Shipley – background vocals
 Amber Smith – background vocals
 Granger Smith – acoustic guitar, electric guitar, keyboards, percussion, lead vocals, background vocals
 Tyler Smith – background vocals
 Bryan Sutton – banjo, acoustic guitar, mandolin
 Heath Tiner – background vocals
 Derek Wells – electric guitar, bouzouki, mandolin
 Brian David Wills - background vocals
 Jonathan Wisinski – bass guitar, background vocals

Charts

Weekly charts

Year-end charts

Singles

Notes

References 

2016 albums
Granger Smith albums
BBR Music Group albums
Albums produced by Frank Rogers (record producer)